Busby Berkeley (born Berkeley William Enos; November 29, 1895 – March 14, 1976) was an American film director and musical choreographer. Berkeley devised elaborate musical production numbers that often involved complex geometric patterns. Berkeley's works used large numbers of showgirls and props as fantasy elements in kaleidoscopic on-screen performances.

Early life 

Berkeley was born in Los Angeles, California, to Francis Enos (who died when Busby was eight) and stage actress Gertrude Berkeley (1864–1946). Among Gertrude's friends, and a performer in Tim Frawly's Stock company run by Busby Berkeley's father, were actress Amy Busby from whom Berkeley gained the appellation "Buzz" or "Busby" and actor William Gillette, then only four years away from playing Sherlock Holmes. Whether he was christened Busby Berkeley William Enos, or Berkeley William Enos, with Busby's being a nickname, is unknown – the "Child's names" entry on his birth certificate is blank.

In addition to her stage work, Gertrude played mother roles in silent films while Berkeley was still a child. Berkeley made his stage début at five, acting in the company of his performing family. In 1917, he lived in Athol, Massachusetts, working as an advertising and sales manager. During World War I, Berkeley served as a field artillery lieutenant, drilling 1,200 soldiers in complex choreography.

Career

Early years
During the 1920s, Berkeley was a dance director for nearly two dozen Broadway musicals, including hits such as A Connecticut Yankee. As a choreographer, Berkeley was less concerned with the dancing skills of his chorus girls as he was with their ability to form themselves into attractive geometric patterns. His musical numbers were among the larger and better-regimented on Broadway.

His earliest film work was in Samuel Goldwyn's Eddie Cantor musicals, where he began developing such techniques as a "parade of faces" (individualizing each chorus girl with a loving close-up), and moving his dancers all over the stage (and often beyond) in as many kaleidoscopic patterns as possible. Berkeley's top shot technique (the kaleidoscope again, this time shot from overhead) appeared seminally in the Cantor films, and also the 1932 Universal film Night World (where he choreographed the number "Who's Your Little Who-Zis?").

Groundbreaking choreographer

Berkeley's numbers were known for starting in the realm of the stage, but quickly exceeding this space by moving into a time and place that could only be cinematic, to return to shots of an applauding audience and the fall of a curtain. He used one camera to achieve this, instead of the usual four, to retain control over his vision so no director could edit the film. As choreographer, Berkeley was allowed a certain degree of independence in his direction of musical numbers, and they were often markedly distinct from (and sometimes in contrast to) the narrative sections of the films. He often didn't even see the other sections of the picture. The numbers he choreographed were mostly upbeat and focused on decoration as opposed to substance, some costing around $10,000 per minute more than the picture they were in. One dramatic exception was the heart-rending and notably martial "Remember My Forgotten Man" from Gold Diggers of 1933, which dealt with the mistreatment of World War I veterans during the Great Depression.

Berkeley's popularity with an entertainment-hungry Depression audience was secured when he choreographed five musicals back-to-back for Warner Bros.: 42nd Street, Footlight Parade, the aforementioned Gold Diggers of 1933, Dames, and Fashions of 1934, as well as In Caliente and Wonder Bar with Dolores del Río.  Berkeley always denied any deep significance to his work, arguing that his main professional goals were to top himself and never repeat his past accomplishments.

As the outsized musicals in which Berkeley specialized became passé, he turned to straight directing. The result was 1939's They Made Me a Criminal, starring John Garfield. Although a success at the box office, it was the only non-musical film Berkeley directed. Berkeley had several well-publicized run-ins with MGM stars such as Judy Garland. In 1943, he was removed as director of Girl Crazy because of disagreements with Garland, but the lavish musical number "I Got Rhythm", which he directed, remained in the picture.

His next stop was at 20th Century-Fox for 1943's The Gang's All Here, in which Berkeley choreographed Carmen Miranda's "Lady in the Tutti-Frutti Hat" number. The film made money, but Berkeley and the Fox brass disagreed over budget matters. Berkeley returned to MGM in the late 1940s, where he conceived the Technicolor finales for the studio's Esther Williams films. Berkeley's final film as choreographer was MGM's Billy Rose's Jumbo (1962).

Later years
In the late 1960s, the camp craze brought the Berkeley musicals back to the forefront. He toured the college and lecture circuit as well as directed a 1930s-style cold medication commercial for Contac capsules titled the "Cold Diggers of 1969", complete with a top shot of a dancing clock. The 75-year-old Berkeley returned to Broadway to direct a successful revival of No No Nanette, starring his old Warner Brothers colleague and 42nd Street star Ruby Keeler; both played cameos in the 1970 film The Phynx the same year.

Personal life 

Berkeley was married six times. His wives included actresses Merna Kennedy, Esther Muir, the starlet Claire James, and Etta Dunn, who survived him. He was involved in an alienation of affections lawsuit in 1938 involving Carole Landis, and he was engaged to Lorraine Stein.

Berkeley drank heavily, often having martinis in his daily bath.

In September 1935, Berkeley was responsible for an automobile accident in which two people were killed and five seriously injured. Badly cut and bruised, he was brought to court on a stretcher, where Time magazine reported he heard testimony that made him wince:
'Witnesses testified that motorist Berkeley sped down Roosevelt Highway in Los Angeles County one night, changed lanes, crashing headlong into one car, sideswiped another. Some witnesses said they smelled liquor on him'.
The first two trials for second degree murder ended with hung juries; he was acquitted in a third.

After his mother died and his career began to slow, he attempted suicide, slitting his wrists and taking an overdose of sleeping pills in July 1946. He was admitted to a hospital for an extended stay, an experience which severely affected his mental state.

Berkeley died from natural causes on March 14, 1976, in Palm Springs, California at the age of 80.  He is buried in the Desert Memorial Park in Cathedral City, California.

Legacy
Berkeley was inducted into the National Museum of Dance's Mr. & Mrs. Cornelius Vanderbilt Whitney Hall of Fame in 1988.

Broadway credits 
 A Connecticut Yankee (1927, choreographer)
 Whoopee! (1928, choreographer)
 No, No, Nanette (1971, production supervisor)

Filmography 

 Whoopee! (1930, choreographer)
 Kiki (1931, choreographer)
 Palmy Days (1931, choreographer)
 Flying High (1931, choreographer)
 Sky Devils (1932, dance director)
 The Kid from Spain (1932, choreographer)
 Night World (1932, choreographer)
 Bird of Paradise (1932, choreographer, native dances)
 She Had to Say Yes (1933, directorial debut)
 42nd Street (1933, choreographer)
 Gold Diggers of 1933 (1933, choreographer)
 Footlight Parade (1933, choreographer)
 Roman Scandals (1933, choreographer)
 Fashions of 1934 (1934, director/choreographer of musical numbers)
 Wonder Bar (1934, designer of musical numbers)
 Dames (1934, director/choreographer of musical numbers)
 Gold Diggers of 1935 (1935, director/also created and staged dances)
 In Caliente (1935, director/choreographer of musical numbers)
 I Live for Love (1935, director)
 Gold Diggers of 1937 (1936, director/choreographer of musical numbers)
 Stage Struck (1936, director)
 The Go Getter (1937, director)
 The Singing Marine (1937, director/choreographer of musical numbers)
 Hollywood Hotel (1937, director)
 Varsity Show (1937, director of finale)
 Gold Diggers in Paris (1938, director/choreographer of musical numbers)
 Men Are Such Fools (1938, director)
 Comet Over Broadway (1938, director, replaced by John Farrow)
 Garden of the Moon (1938, director)
 They Made Me a Criminal (1939, director)
 Fast and Furious (1939, director)
 Broadway Serenade (1939, director of finale)
 Babes in Arms (1939, director)
 Strike Up the Band (1940, director)
 Forty Little Mothers (1940, director)
 Ziegfeld Girl (1941, director of musical numbers)
 Babes on Broadway (1941, director)
 Lady Be Good (1941, director of musical numbers)
 For Me and My Gal (1942, director)
 Cabin in the Sky (1943, director of "Shine" sequence)
 Girl Crazy (1943, director of "I Got Rhythm" finale)
 The Gang's All Here (1943, director)
 Cinderella Jones (1946, director)
 Romance on the High Seas (1948, choreographer)
 Take Me Out to the Ball Game (1949, director)
 Annie Get Your Gun (1950, uncredited director)
 Two Weeks with Love (1950, choreographer)
 Call Me Mister (1951, choreographer)
 Two Tickets to Broadway (1951, choreographer)
 Million Dollar Mermaid (1952, choreographer)
 Small Town Girl (1953, choreographer)
 Easy to Love (1953, choreographer)
 Rose Marie (1954, choreographer)
 Billy Rose's Jumbo (1962, choreographer)

See also 
 Busby Berkeley using alternate takes to circumvent censorship

References

External links 

 
 
 
 
 
 Hooray for Hollywood: Busby Berkeley
 Busby Berkeley at Classic Movie Favorites Tribute site: galleries, bio, filmography and more.
 bio & pics on Busby Berkeley
Contac capsule cold commercial "Cold Diggers of 1969".
Busby Berkeley Collection includes mainly correspondence between Busby Berkeley and Gen Genovese, held by the Jerome Lawrence and Robert E. Lee Theatre Research Institute, The Ohio State University Libraries.

1895 births
1976 deaths
American choreographers
American military personnel of World War I
Burials at Desert Memorial Park
Film choreographers
Film directors from Los Angeles